BlackPAC is a left-leaning political action committee focused on mobilizing and engaging with African American voters. It was founded in 2016. It has worked to turn out black voters in prominent elections in the United States, including the 2017 United States Senate special election in Alabama and the 2017 Virginia gubernatorial election. BlackPAC works with non-partisan VoteRiders to spread state-specific information on voter ID requirements.

References

External links

Political organizations established in 2016
United States political action committees
2016 establishments in the United States